Brunia sarawaca is a moth of the family Erebidae. It was described by Arthur Gardiner Butler in 1877. It is found on Borneo, Peninsular Malaysia, Java and the north-eastern Himalayas. The habitat consists of lowland forests.

References

Lithosiina
Moths described in 1877